Sabrina Margarita Alcantara-Tan (born June 10, 1970) is a writer and the creator of the print zine series Bamboo Girl. The zine is no longer active as Alcantara has an active acupuncture practice in New York.

Bamboo Girl 
Bamboo Girl was an independent print zine which circulated in the US from 1995-2005. It highlighted content that commented on homophobia, racism and sexism. Alcantara notably featured Filipina authors: Ninotchka Rosca, Jessica Hagedorn, Perla Daly, in the series.

Education 
She received her Masters of Science in Acupuncture at the Pacific College of Oriental Medicine. She is now a licensed acupuncturist.

Personal life 
Alcantara is an Asian-American queer woman. Alcantara was born in Pennsylvania. She now lives in New York City.

References 

Living people
1970 births
American women journalists
American writers of Filipino descent
Acupuncturists
American women writers
Women in publishing
American publishers (people)
21st-century American women
Writers from Pennsylvania